Brian Stewart McKenzie (born March 16, 1951) is a Canadian former professional ice hockey player. He played 6 games in the National Hockey League with the Pittsburgh Penguins during the 1971–72 season and 87 games in the World Hockey Association with the Edmonton Oilers and Indianapolis Racers during the 1973–74 and 1974–75 seasons.

Career 
McKenzie was drafted 18th overall by the Pittsburgh Penguins in the 1971 NHL Amateur Draft and played six games for the Penguins during the 1971–72 season. He also played in the World Hockey Association for the Edmonton Oilers and the Indianapolis Racers.

Career statistics

Regular season and playoffs

External links
 

1951 births
Living people
Canadian ice hockey centres
Edmonton Oilers (WHA) players
Hershey Bears players
Ice hockey people from Ontario
Indianapolis Racers players
Milwaukee Admirals (IHL) players
Mohawk Valley Comets players
Omaha Knights (CHL) players
Pittsburgh Penguins draft picks
Pittsburgh Penguins players
St. Catharines Black Hawks players
Sportspeople from St. Catharines
Toledo Goaldiggers players